Talhar is a town of Badin District, Sindh, Pakistan. It is located 240 kilometers east of Karachi. The population is 58,000, most of whom are Sindhi Muslims. Talhar is a Tehsil (an administratively subdivisional unit) of Badin District . Talhar tehsil comprises two town committees, Talhar and Rajo Khanani , and it has six union councils.

References

Populated places in Badin District
Tehsils of Sindh